Loretta Huber was a World Series of Poker champion in the 1988 $500 Ladies - Limit 7 Card Stud event.

As of 2008, her total tournament winnings exceed $21,000.

World Series of Poker bracelets

References

American poker players
World Series of Poker bracelet winners
Female poker players
People from Las Vegas
Living people
Year of birth missing (living people)
Place of birth missing (living people)